The Bishop of Hexham was an episcopal title which took its name after the market town of Hexham in Northumberland, England. The title was first used by the Anglo-Saxons in the 7th and 9th centuries, and then by the Roman Catholic Church since the 19th century.

Anglo-Saxon bishops
The first Diocese of Lindisfarne was merged into the Diocese of York in 664. York diocese was then divided in 678 by Archbishop Theodore of Canterbury, forming a bishopric for the country between the Rivers Aln and Tees, with a seat at Hexham. This gradually and erratically merged back into the bishopric of Lindisfarne. Eleven bishops of Hexham followed St. Eata, of which six were saints.

No successor was appointed in 821, the condition of the country being too unsettled. A period of disorder followed the Danish devastations, after which Hexham monastery was reconstituted in 1113 as a priory of Austin Canons, which flourished until its dissolution under Henry VIII. Meantime the bishopric had been merged in that of Lindisfarne, which latter see was removed to Chester-le-Street in 883, and thence to Durham in 995.

Modern Catholic bishops

References

Bibliography

External links
Episcopal succession in Anglo-Saxon England

Religion in Northumberland
Bishops of Hexham